Wong Yi Lin Michelle (born 15 May 1991) is a Singaporean actress, host and model. She was a finalist for The 5 Search competition.

Career
Wong starred in several dramas starting from 2005, including Kids Central production Double Chin 2 and Heartlanders (Series 3). From 2011 to 2014, she starred in various films, such as Across the Straits, Acceptance, 3 Peas in a Pod and Woodlands, 2007. Also in 2014, Wong starred in a minor role in the film adaptation of Joker Game, released in 2015.

In 2015, Wong's big break came when she participated in The 5 Search, and emerged as one of the finalists. Since then, she was offered a Mediacorp contract and starred as one of the main cast in MediaCorp Channel 8 long-running drama Peace & Prosperity.

In 2016, she had filmed The Queen.

In 2018, she completed her filming for an english series, Code Of Law (Season 4), made a cameo appearance Eat Already? 4 and also dramas with heavier roles such as A Million Dollar Dream, Babies On Board & Blessings 2. She is currently working on a long form drama Jalan Jalan and a drama which debut next year, Hello From The Other Side.

Personal life
Wong studied in Anglo-Chinese Junior College, where she studied under the Theatre Studies Program.

Filmography

Film

Television

Compilation album

Awards and nominations

References

External links
 
 

1991 births
Living people
Singaporean television actresses
Singaporean female models